The Cactus Blossoms is an American indie rock band based in Minneapolis, Minnesota. The band is composed of brothers Jack Torrey (aka Mr. cactus, guitar, bass, vocals) and Page Burkum (aka Mr. Blossom, guitar, vocals) with a touring act including their older brother Tyler Burkum (guitar), their cousin Phillip Hicks (bass), Jake Hanson (guitar) and Jeremy Hanson (drums).

The band's musical styling of "the sounds and approaches of early country and rock n’ roll" was inspired by traditional American folk music and "hillbilly" music and is "reminiscent of 60s Nashville and Los Angeles as heard in artists like Roy Orbison, The Byrds, and Duane Eddy."

The band's third studio album, One Day, was released on Walkie Talkie Records on February 11, 2022.

History 
Brothers Jack Torrey and Page Burkum began playing music today at ages 18 and 23, respectively but didn't form the band The Cactus Blossoms until they were both in their 30s. The band began playing local shows in Minneapolis in 2010 and self produced and released a self-titled debut album in 2011. Their popularity secured them a residency at St. Paul's Turf Club where they self produced their first live album titled Live at the Turf Club.

After several tours supporting other artists, JD McPherson proposed working together, where he would produce their first studio album. In 2015 the band signed with Red House Records and on January 22, 2016 released their first studio album titled You're Dreaming. The album reached #23 on the Americana Billboard chart and was met with favorable reviews with American Songwriter describing it as "honest, unvarnished, completely engaging style that is clearly retro but in no way musty."

The band was contacted by David Lynch's office to appear in the revival season of the televisions series Twin Peaks where the band performed "Mississippi". The song is also featured on the soundtrack album, Twin Peaks: Music from the Limited Event Series.

In 2017 the band was invited by Dan Auerbach to his Nashville studio to write some songs together. Two of the songs, "Got a Lotta Love" and "Blue as the Ocean" appeared on their studio album Easy Way which released March 1, 2019. Departing Red House Records, the album was released on the band's own Walkie Talkie Records label.

After taking a forced hiatus due to the COVID-19 pandemic and experiencing the protests in Minneapolis following the murder of George Floyd, the band began recording their third studio album in an at-home studio. On December 3, 2021 the band announced their third studio album One Day would release on February 11, 2022.

Members 

 Jack Torrey (guitar, bass, vocals) 
 Page Burkum (guitar, vocals) 
 Tyler Burkum (guitar)
 Phillip Hicks (bass)
 Jake Hanson (guitar)  
 Jeremy Hanson (drums)

Discography

Studio albums

Live albums 

 Live at the Turf Club (2013)

Singles 

 "Happy Man" (2020)

References 

Musical groups from Minnesota
Musical groups established in 2010
American indie folk groups
2010 establishments in Minnesota